Gug Tappeh (also Romanized as Gūg Tappeh; also known as Gog Tappeh) is a village in Akhtachi-ye Mahali Rural District, Simmineh District, Bukan County, West Azerbaijan Province, Iran. At the 2006 census, its population was 113, in 21 families.

References 

Populated places in Bukan County